The 1979–1980 FIRA Trophy was the 20th edition of a European rugby union championship for national teams.

The tournament was won by France, who achieved a Grand Slam.

First division 
Table

Morocco relegated to division 2

Results

Second division 
Table

Spain promoted to division 1

Sweden relegated to division 3

Results

Third Division 
Table

Results

Tunisia promoted to division 2

Bibliography 
 Francesco Volpe, Valerio Vecchiarelli (2000), 2000 Italia in Meta, Storia della nazionale italiana di rugby dagli albori al Sei Nazioni, GS Editore (2000) .
 Francesco Volpe, Paolo Pacitti (Author), Rugby 2000, GTE Gruppo Editorale (1999).

References

External links
 FIRA-AER official website

1979–80 in European rugby union
1979–80
1979 rugby union tournaments for national teams
1980 rugby union tournaments for national teams